Infinite Energy is a bi-monthly magazine published in New Hampshire that details theories and experiments concerning alternative energy, new science and new physics. The magazine was founded by the late Eugene Mallove, and is owned by the non-profit New Energy Foundation. It was established in 1994 as Cold Fusion magazine  and changed its name in March 1995.

Topics of interest include "new hydrogen physics," also called cold fusion; vacuum energy, or zero point energy; and so-called "environmental energy" which they define as the attempt to violate the Second Law of Thermodynamics, for example with a perpetual motion machine.  This is done in pursuit of the founder's commitment to "unearthing new sources of energy and new paradigms in science."  The magazine has also published articles and book reviews that are critical of the Big Bang theory that describes the origin of the universe.

The magazine has a print run of 3,000, and is available on U.S. newsstands.  The issues range in size from 48 to 100 pages.

References

External links

 

Sustainable energy
Bimonthly magazines published in the United States
Science and technology magazines published in the United States
Cold fusion
Criticism of science
Free energy conspiracy theories
Magazines established in 1994
Perpetual motion
Magazines published in New Hampshire
Energy magazines
Pseudoscience literature